Cameroon has competed at every Commonwealth Games since joining the Commonwealth in 1995. They have won 34 medals, including ten golds, 10 silvers and 14 bronze medals.

Medals

References

 
Nations at the Commonwealth Games